The following is a list of full-power non-commercial educational radio stations in the United States broadcasting programming from National Public Radio (NPR), which can be sorted by their call signs, frequencies, band, city of license and state. HD Radio subchannels and low-power translators are not included.

External links 

Npr